Lucien Bernier (born May 27, 1914, in Guadeloupe, and died April 5, 1989) was a politician from Guadeloupe who was elected to the French Senate in 1958 .

References 
 page on the French Senate website

Guadeloupean politicians
French people of Guadeloupean descent
French Senators of the Fourth Republic
French Senators of the Fifth Republic
1914 births
1989 deaths
Senators of Guadeloupe